Cemetery Station No. 3 was a railway station on Sydney's Rookwood Cemetery railway line.  It served the Rookwood Cemetery.

History

The station opened as Mortuary station on 26 May 1897. The name was changed to Mortuary Terminus on 26 July 1897, then to Cemetery Station No. 3 on 15 June 1908. The station was closed on 29 December 1948.  Its location is adjacent to the current Catholic Cemeteries Board HQ office and carpark and the 408 bus terminus.

References

Statistics for sidebar
 Distance from Central railway station: 18.821 km

Neighbouring stations

Disused railway stations in Sydney
1948 disestablishments in Australia
Railway stations in Australia opened in 1897
Railway stations closed in 1948